La-Ong-Fong is a Thai pop band. It was formed in 1996. The name of the band comes from enfant (French for "child"), transliterated as "" (pronounced Ong-Fong). Then they put the word "" (La) in front of it, to make it sound more Thai "" (La-Ong-Fong) as "" (La-Ong) in Thai has its own meaning as "drizzle", and "" (Fong) as "bubble".

The band's music style is influenced by Swedish pop. The notabilities of this band are a vibrant music that mixes jazz, pop and rock together, and the singer's vocals are crystal clear.

History of the band
La-Ong-Fong started from the meeting between Ae and Chomphoo in the Coke Duet Singing Contest in 1988. Then, Chomphoo signed as an artist at Grammy Records and invited Ae to join the band. Ae invited Fluke, a senior at his old school to be the drummer, Nhong, his colleague, to be the keyboardist and Man, Nhong's junior at university, to be the guitarist.

The first album of the band, Volume 1, was not quite successful in terms of sales and responses from the audiences generally. After that, the band was dispersed.

In November 2004, three members of La-Ong-Fong came back and released a new EP album, Volume 2. This album was well received by both new audiences and fans. On 5 September 2005, they released the full album, Cozy Collection.

In 2011, La-Ong-Fong, with a new look, released a new album, Wind-up City. Ab Chob ("like") is the most popular song on the album.

Band members

Original members
Visa Attaseri (Chomphoo) lead vocals
Vichaya Vatanasapt (Nhong) keyboards
Danop Srikao (Fluke) drums
Tanupop Notayanont (Man) guitar
Pongchuk Pissathanporn (Ae) bass guitar

Current members
Kornkamol Chaiwattanamethin (On) lead vocals
Tanupop Notayanont (Man) guitar
Pongchuk Pissathanporn (Ae) bass guitar / backing vocals

Discography

Volume 1 
Rong Seang Lam Yai records (2539)
"Wan" ("Day")
"La" ("Bye")
"Korb Fah" ("Horizon")
"Rao" ("Us")
"Rak" ("Love")
"Kuen" ("Night")
"Lom" ("Wind")
"Mont" ("Magic")
"Pak" ("Break")

EP Volume 2
(No record label)
"Long" ("Try") 
"Fak Fha" ("Leave with sky") 
"Message Rak" ("Love Message")
"Lunla...Meua Dai Pob Ter" ("Happy when I meet her")

Cozy Collection
Spicy Disc Records (Sep 2005) 
"Tang Jai Deaw" ("Each heart") 
"Ter Ja Cheua Mai" ("Will you believe?") 
"Kit Tueng" ("Miss") 
"Lunla...Meua Dai Pob Ter" ("Happy when I meet her") 
"Message Rak" ("Love Message")
"Kon Bon Fha" ("Person on sky") 
"Ter Kub Chan" ("You and me") 
"Reang Rah" ("Joyful") 
"Dok Mai Khang Khang Ter" ("Flower beside her") 
"Tang Jai Deaw" ("Each heart") (Minus) 
"Long" ("Try")

EP Ngao Jon Chin (เหงาจนชิน; "Lonely, be accustomed") 
Spicy Disc Records (2007)
"Ngao Jon Chin" ("Lonely, be accustomed") 
"Ter Ja Cheua Mai" ("Will you believe?") 
"Ter Kub Chan" ("You and me")

Love Story 
Spicy Disc Records (2009) 
"Sing Tee Mai Roo" ("Unknown things")

Tales 
Spicy Disc Records (2009) 
"Korb Fah Phan Nam Ra Ya Tang Ra Wang Song Rao" ("Horizon, water plate and distance between us")

Past Forward 
Spicy Disc Records (2010) 
"Fhun Lam Aieng" ("Unfair dream")

Wind-up City
"So in Love"
"Ab Chob" ("Like") 
"Kod" ("Hug") 
"A Rai" ("What") 
"Ngao Jon Chin" ("Lonely, be accustomed") 
"Meua Rhai Ja Chao" ("When the morning") 
"Kae Fhun Kor Por" ("It is just a dream") 
"Rak Pued Peay" ("Open Love") 
"Ror" ("Wait") 
"Krai Nhor" ("Who") 
"Ter Tung nun" ("Only you") 
"Khob Khun na" ("Thank you")

Concert

Popularity

2005
Tang Jai Deaw song ("Each heart") reached number 77 on the Fat 100 chart annual 2005 and the greatest rank was 17th on weekly rankings. Moreover, it was also in the Fat Radio chart for 29 weeks that is the third longest.

2011
A Rai song ("What") reached number 25 on the Fat 100 annual 2011 and the greatest rank was third on weekly rankings.

References

 17 ปีที่อดทนจนเป็นละอองฟอง
 you2play ศิลปิน ละอองฟอง
 สัมภาษณ์ ละอองฟอง
 "ละอองฟอง" ไม่ได้มีดีแค่นักร้องน่ารัก
 ออน ละอองฟองตื้นตัน ห่างหายไป 7 ปีแฟนๆยังไม่ลืม
 ละอองฟองเปิดตัวอัลบั้มใหม่ Wind-up City
 Follow This ละอองฟอง
 "ออน-ละอองฟอง" เสียน้ำตา โดน "2 หนุ่ม" ตีตัวออกห่าง -รายการสาระแน
 รายการสาระแน – ละอองฟอง

External links
 ละอองฟอง Official website
 La-Ong-Fong Official Youtube Channel
 La-Ong-Fong Official Fanpage
 La-Ong-Fong on Twitter
 Spicydisc
 Instagram : Laongfongband
 La-Ong-Fong CDs store Worldwide Shipping
 Albums and Lyrics La Ong Fong (ละอองฟอง)

Thai pop music groups
Musical groups from Bangkok